Brenda of the Barge is a 1920 British silent romance film directed by Arthur Rooke and starring Marjorie Villis, James Knight and Bernard Dudley.

Cast
 Marjorie Villis as Brenda 
 James Knight as Jim Walden 
 Bernard Dudley as Harry 
 Blanche Stanley as Mary Brown 
 Tom Coventry as Judd Brown 
 Rose Sharp as Mrs. Walden

References

External links

1920 films
1920s romance films
British silent feature films
British romance films
Films directed by Arthur Rooke
British black-and-white films
1920s English-language films
1920s British films